Stadio Tupparello is a multi-use stadium in Acireale, Italy.  It is currently used mostly for football matches and is the home ground of S.S.D. Acireale Calcio 1946.  The stadium holds 12,100.

Tupparello
Sports venues in Sicily